The 2013–14 Rice Owls men's basketball team represented Rice University during the 2013–14 NCAA Division I men's basketball season. The Owls, led by sixth year head coach Ben Braun, played their home games at the Tudor Fieldhouse and were members of Conference USA. They finished the season 7–23, 2–14 in C-USA play to finish in last place. They lost in the first round of the C-USA tournament to North Texas.

At the end of the season, head coach Ben Braun resigned after accumulating a six-year record of 63–128. He was replaced by Mike Rhoades, former assistant at VCU.

Roster

Schedule

|-
!colspan=9 style="background:#002469; color:#5e6062;"| Regular season

|-
!colspan=9 style="background:#002469; color:#5e6062;"| 2014 Conference USA tournament

References

Rice Owls men's basketball seasons
Rice